Massino Visconti (usually called simply Massino) is a municipality in the Province of Novara, in the Italian region of Piedmont, located about  northeast of Turin and about  north of Novara.

Massino Visconti is bordered by the municipalities of Armeno, Brovello-Carpugnino, Lesa and Nebbiuno.

Massino got the suffix "Visconti" from the House of Visconti of Milan, an important noble family in medieval Italy, who were initially the lords of Massino.

References

Cities and towns in Piedmont